Lower Hatchie National Wildlife Refuge, part of the U.S. National Wildlife Refuge system, is a  area of wetlands associated with the confluence of the Hatchie River and the Forked Deer River in West Tennessee near the confluence of the Hatchie River with the Mississippi River. Located in parts of southwestern Lauderdale and northern Tipton counties, it is a rich environment for both aquatic life and waterfowl.

References
Refuge website

Protected areas of Lauderdale County, Tennessee
National Wildlife Refuges in Tennessee
Protected areas of Tipton County, Tennessee
Wetlands of Tennessee
Landforms of Tipton County, Tennessee
Landforms of Lauderdale County, Tennessee